Cowan Heights is a west end neighbourhood in St. John's, Newfoundland and Labrador. Canada Drive and Frecker Drive are the two main road-ways that run through most of the neighbourhood.

Schools
Cowan Heights has two schools. They are St. Matthews Elementary (115 Cowan Avenue) and Cowan Heights Elementary (100 Canada Drive). Though their addresses are on different streets, the schools are directly across from each other.

Streets
Some streets of Cowan Heights are:
Bancroft Place
Bellevue Crescent
Birmingham Street
Brownsdale Street
Burin Street
Burling Crescent
Brigus Place
Browne Crescent
Canada Drive
Cape Broyle Place
Cherrington Street
Codroy Place
Cowan Avenue
Creston Place
Duntara Crescent
Ferryland Street (East and West)
Gander Crescent
Gillingham Place
Gladney Street
Grant Place
Greenspond Drive
Harrington Drive
Hopeall Street
Lodge Place
Macleod Place
Newman Street
Organ Place
Point Lemington Street
Point Verde Place
Roddickton Place
Salter Place
Spratt Place
Tanner Street
Trepassey Place
Trinity Street
Torngat Crescent
Wabush Place

See also
Neighbourhoods in St. John's, Newfoundland and Labrador

References
Official Website Of St. John's

External links
Cowan Heights Elementary Website
St. Matthew's Elementary Website
Cowan Heights United Church Website

Neighbourhoods in St. John's, Newfoundland and Labrador